"V.I.P.P." is the 26th television play episode of the first season of the Australian anthology television series Australian Playhouse. "V.I.P.P." was written by Pat Flower and directed by Brian Faull and originally aired on ABC on 10 October 1966.

Flower was one of the leading writers in Australian television at the time.

Plot
A Very Important Political Personage faces a crisis of state. His secretary is Miss Greensleeves. Lady Montpelier runs off with the chauffeur. His wife Effie offers an ultimatum.

Cast
 Raymond Westwell
 Barbara Joss
 Sheila Florance
 Campbell Copelin
 Kurt Ludescher
 Dennis Clinton

Reception
The Age felt the script was full of cliches and wasted the actors "and all those elaborate sets. The ABC should have another look at productions of such little value as this one."

See also
 List of live television plays broadcast on ABC (1956–1969)

References

External links
 
 
 

1966 television plays
1966 Australian television episodes
1960s Australian television plays
Australian Playhouse (season 1) episodes
Black-and-white television episodes